2007 World Championships may refer to:

 Alpine skiing: Alpine World Ski Championships 2007
 American Football: 2007 IFAF World Championship
 Aquatics: 2007 World Aquatics Championships
 Athletics: 2007 World Championships in Athletics
Cross-country running: 2007 IAAF World Cross Country Championships
Road running: 2007 IAAF World Road Running Championships
 Badminton: 2007 BWF World Championships
 Bandy: Bandy World Championship 2007
 Biathlon: Biathlon World Championships 2007
 Boxing: 2007 World Amateur Boxing Championships
 Chess: FIDE World Chess Championship 2007
 Curling:
 2007 Ford World Men's Curling Championship
 2007 World Women's Curling Championship
 Darts: 2007 BDO World Darts Championship
 Darts: 2007 PDC World Darts Championship
 Figure skating: 2007 World Figure Skating Championships
 Ice hockey: 2007 Men's World Ice Hockey Championships
 Ice hockey: 2007 Women's World Ice Hockey Championships
 Netball: 2007 Netball World Championships
 Nordic skiing: FIS Nordic World Ski Championships 2007
 Rowing: 2007 World Rowing Championships
 Speed skating:
Allround: 2007 World Allround Speed Skating Championships
Sprint: 2007 World Sprint Speed Skating Championships
Single distances: 2007 World Single Distance Speed Skating Championships
 Weightlifting: 2007 World Weightlifting Championships

See also
 2007 World Cup (disambiguation)
 2007 Continental Championships (disambiguation)
 2007 World Junior Championships (disambiguation)